Komlan Agbeko Assignon (born 21 January 1974) is a Togolese former professional footballer who played as a midfielder.

Assignon played with a number of French clubs, including AS Cannes, AS Beauvais Oise and US Créteil-Lusitanos. His final year of play was with Al Jahra in Kuwait.

Assignon capped for the Togo national team at the 1998, 2000 and 2002 African Cup of Nations. In total he got 20 caps and four goals.

Personal life
Assignon's son, Lorenz Assignon, is a professional footballer for Rennes.

References

1974 births
Living people
Sportspeople from Lomé
Association football midfielders
Togolese footballers
Togo international footballers
1998 African Cup of Nations players
2000 African Cup of Nations players
2002 African Cup of Nations players
AS Cannes players
AS Beauvais Oise players
US Créteil-Lusitanos players
Al Jahra SC players
Ligue 1 players
Ligue 2 players
Kuwait Premier League players
Togolese expatriate footballers
Expatriate footballers in France
Togolese expatriate sportspeople in France
Expatriate footballers in Kuwait
Togolese expatriate sportspeople in Kuwait
21st-century Togolese people